The second season of musical game show Everybody, Sing! premiered on Kapamilya Channel, Kapamilya Online Live, A2Z and TV5 on September 24, 2022, replacing the second season of Idol Philippines and ended on February 19, 2023.

Overview
The second season was confirmed by Vice Ganda on his noontime show It's Showtime.

Promotion
On September 18, 2022, Vice Ganda appeared on the second season finale of Idol Philippines to promote the musical game show's new season. He even gave away one-thousand pesos to audience members that sang a correct song lyric of the song "Pearly Shells".

Timeslot
The show airs every Saturdays and Sundays at 7:00 PM on Kapamilya Channel, Kapamilya Online Live, and A2Z and a delayed telecast at 9:30 PM every Saturdays and 9:00 PM every Sundays on TV5 replacing the timeslot left behind by the second season of Idol Philippines.

Changes
The second season saw a major re-improvement from the inaugural season. These were the following:

Production
 Number of participants — The maximum number of participants that can play was increased from twenty-five (25) to fifty (50), a first since the show's premiere in 2021,
 Doubled jackpot prize — The possible jackpot prize that a Songbayanan can take home was doubled, from five hundred thousand pesos (₱500,000), to one million pesos (₱1,000,000), with each player still receiving twenty-thousand pesos (₱20,000),
 Interaction allowance — Unlike the previous season, Vice was not permitted to interact with the players, with transparent wall barriers in place for each player to practice social distancing. Now that the show required its players to be fully vaccinated, Vice was then able to engage with them, but with transparent wall barriers still in place to maintain social distancing with other players, and
 New graphics — This season featured a new title card and improved graphics.

The changes were made possible due to the lowering of COVID-19 restrictions in the country.

Gameplay
 The Singko Segundo Challenge – A new mini-round played before the jackpot round, in which the Songbayanan has a chance to add an additional five (5) seconds to their jackpot timer.
 Two new game modes — This season saw the debut of two new games, namely; A-B-Sing! and AYU-Sing Mo!, during the 50 Funeral and Cemetery Workers episode on October 29, 2022.

Episodes overview 
Legend

Guest vocalists
Vice would invite a series of guest singers in lieu of the resident band's lead vocalists.

 Erik Santos — The Philippines' Prince of Pop appeared as a guest vocalist on the 50 Sales Agents episode last October 9, 2022. Erik sang "Kulang Ako Kung Wala Ka" and "Maging Sino Ka Man", that were played during the games The ChooSing One and ReverSing.
 Klarisse de Guzman — The Philippines' Soul Diva appeared as a guest vocalist on the 50 Mangingisda episode last November 13, 2022, in promotion for her upcoming first major concert, Klarisse: Her Time. Klarisse sang "Wala Na Talaga" and "Paalam Na", that were played during the games The ChooSing One and AYU-Sing Mo!.
 Darren Espanto — The Asia's Heartthrob appeared as a guest vocalist on the 50 Dentists episode last February 11, 2023, in promotion for the finale of Dream Maker: Search for the Next Global Pop Group. Darren sang "Dying Inside (To Hold You)" (a cover of the original song by Timmy Thomas for the 2017 film All of You), and "In Love Ako Sayo", that were played during the games The ChooSing One and AYU-Sing Mo!.

Gameplay
While games such as Sing in the Blank, PicSing a Broken Song, and The ChooSing One also appeared in this season, this season saw the debut of three new games; namely, A-B-Sing, Ayu-Sing Mo!, and the Singko Segundo Challenge. Both A-B-Sing and Ayu-SING Mo! were first introduced on the 50 Funeral and Cemetery Workers episode last October 29, 2022.

A-B-Sing!
With the resident band playing the song as usual, this game requires the SONG-pu to guess the missing lyric based on its first letter and its number of syllables as their clue. The song stops for a while and the three-second timer starts for the contestant to figure out the missing lyric through the clue said by the resident band. The clue is based on the number of syllables of the missing lyric. For example, if the missing lyric is "comment", then the resident band will sing "C-C" as their clue. Each correct answer given by the SONG-pu adds an additional two seconds to their jackpot timer and gives them one thousand pesos (₱1,000). Should a contestant fail to give an answer within three seconds, or gets their answer wrong, their line will be skipped and the next player must guess his or her assigned clue. This will continue until all SONG-pu members have finished their attempts.

AYU-Sing Mo!
With the resident band playing the song as usual, this game requires the SONG-pu to arrange four jumbled lyrics in the correct order. The song stops for a while and the three-second timer starts for the contestant to arrange the four jumbled lyrics in order. Take note that the contestant should sing the exact order of lines with no added words or sentences in order for their answer to be correct. Each correct answer given by the SONG-pu adds an additional four seconds to their jackpot timer and gives them one thousand pesos (₱1,000). Should a contestant fail to give an answer within three seconds, or gets their answer wrong, their line will be skipped and the next player must arrange his or her assigned lines. This will continue until all SONG-pu members have finished their attempts.

The Singko Segundo Challenge
This season introduced a new mini-game entitled the Singko Segundo Challenge, that will be played before the jackpot round. In this mini-challenge, a Songbayanan has a chance to add an additional five seconds to their jackpot timer.

Once all of the groups have played, the Songbayanan will choose a representative (dubbed as Repre-SING-tative) for this round. Once chosen, the said representative will then guess the song sang by Vice Ganda himself, by only using a related word based on the Songbayanan. For example, if the Songbayanan are beauticians, then the word that Vice will sing is kilay. The Repre-SING-tative is allowed to answer Vice's question in five seconds once Vice finishes singing.

The Repre-SING-tative must correctly answer the said question in order for their group to add an additional five seconds to their jackpot timer. If not, then the Songbayanan's jackpot timer will stay the same as before.

{| class="wikitable" style="text-align:center; font-size:100%; line-height:18px;" width="100%"
|-
|+List of the results of the Singko Segundo Challenge
|-
! ChallengeNo.
! Songbayanan
! Repre-SING-tative(Representative)
! Chosen word
! Response
! Correct answer
! Result
|-style="height: 2.5em;"
! 1
| 
| Lhyn
| Kilay(eyebrows)
| style="background:lightgray;" | No response
| Chuva Choo Choo(Jolina Magdangal)
| style="background:#ff726f;" | Failed
|-style="height: 2.5em;"
! 2
| 
| Rose
| Benta(sale)
| Paalam Na
| Paalam Na(Rachel Alejandro)
| style="background:#a0ee90;" | Passed
|-style="height: 2.5em;"
! 3
| 
| Che
| Pechay(cabbage)
| style="background:lightgray;" | No response
| With a Smile(Eraserheads)
| style="background:#ff726f;" | Failed
|-style="height: 2.5em;"
! 4
| 
| Tsugua
| Suki(customer)
| Spageti 
| Spageti Song(SexBomb Girls)
| style="background:#ff726f;" | Failed
|-style="height: 2.5em;"
! 5
| 
| Jay-ar
| Pako(nail)
| style="background:lightgray;" | No response
| Sana Dalawa Ang Puso Ko(Bodjie's Law of Gravity)
| style="background:#ff726f;" | Failed
|-style="height: 2.5em;"
! 6
| 
| Jessica
| Quota
| style="background:lightgray;" | No response
| Gusto Ko Lamang Sa Buhay(Itchyworms)
| style="background:#ff726f;" | Failed
|-style="height: 2.5em;"
! 7
| 
| Aleck 
| Tusok(prick)
| Kailan
| Kailan(Smokey Mountain)
| style="background:#a0ee90;" | Passed
|-style="height: 2.5em;"
! 8
| 
| Baste
| Datung(money)
| Kisapmata
| Kisapmata(Rivermaya)
| style="background:#a0ee90;" | Passed
|-style="height: 2.5em;"
! 9
| 
| Jhay-Jhay
| Libing(bury)
| Si Aida, O SiLorna, O Si Fe 
| Si Aida, Si Lorna, O Si Fe(Marco Sison)
| style="background:#ff726f;" | Failed
|-style="height: 2.5em;"
! 10
| 
| Jojo
| Ayusin(arrange)
| style="background:lightgray;" | No response
| Himala(Rivermaya)
| style="background:#ff726f;" | Failed
|-style="height: 2.5em;"
! 11
| 
| Aming
| Gas
| style="background:lightgray;" | No response
| Magasin(Eraserheads)
| style="background:#ff726f;" | Failed
|-style="height: 2.5em;"
! 12
| 
| Lupa
| Tibay(strength)
| Annie Batungbakal
| Annie Batungbakal(Hotdog)
| style="background:#a0ee90;" | Passed
|-style="height: 2.5em;"
! 13
| 
| Kimpuchu
| Isda(fish)
| Ligaya
| Ligaya(Eraserheads)
| style="background:#a0ee90;" | Passed
|-style="height: 2.5em;"
! 14
| 
| Jeng
| Mukha(face)
| style="background:lightgray;" | No response
| Penge Naman Ako N'yan(Itchyworms)
| style="background:#ff726f;" | Failed
|-style="height: 2.5em;"
! 15
| 
| Lady Chelsea
| Ganda(beauty)
| Beh, Buti Nga
| Beh, Buti Nga(Hotdog)
| style="background:#a0ee90;" | Passed
|-style="height: 2.5em;"
! 16
| 
| Boom
| Sulat(write)
| Bonggahan
| Bonggahan(Sampaguita)
| style="background:#a0ee90;" | Passed
|-style="height: 2.5em;"
! 17
| 
| Mindy
| Rampa(stroll)
| May Bukas Pa
| May Bukas Pa(Rico J. Puno)
| style="background:#a0ee90;" | Passed
|-style="height: 2.5em;"
! 18
| 
| Mhaxie
| Kislap(sparkle)
| Tala
| Tala(Sarah Geronimo)
| style="background:#a0ee90;" | Passed
|-style="height: 2.5em;"
! 19
| 
| Nams
| Inom(drink)
| Pamela
| Pamela(Vhong Navarro)
| style="background:#a0ee90;" | Passed
|-style="height: 2.5em;"
! 20
| 
| Teteng
| Tanim(plant)
| Kahit Maputi NaAng Buhok Ko
| Kahit Maputi Na Ang Buhok Ko(Rey Valera)
| style="background:#a0ee90;" | Passed
|-style="height: 2.5em;"
! 21
| 
| Nikki
| Kalye(street)
| 214
| 214(Rivermaya)
| style="background:#a0ee90;" | Passed
|-style="height: 2.5em;"
! 22
| 
| Bing
| Abroad
| Bakit Ako Mahihiya
| Kastilyong Buhangin(Basil Valdez)
| style="background:#ff726f;" | Failed
|-style="height: 2.5em;"
! 23
| 
| Dags
| Toda
| Legs Legs MoAy Nakakasilaw
| Legs(Hagibis)
| style="background:#ff726f;" | Failed
|-style="height: 2.5em;"
! 24
| 
| Rence
| Truck
| Jeepney
| Toyang(Eraserheads)
| style="background:#ff726f;" | Failed
|-style="height: 2.5em;"
! 25
| 
| Bucs
| Ngipin(teeth)
| Bituing WalangNingning
| (Sharon Cuneta)
| style="background:#a0ee90;" | Passed
|-style="height: 2.5em;"
! 26
| {{nowrap|50 Magkasintahan at Mag-Ex}}
| Bjay
| Love
| Tindahan ni Aling Nena| (Eraserheads)
| style="background:#a0ee90;" | Passed|}

Statistics
Statistics of performances by every Songbayanan as of February 11, 2023:

Gameplay
This section includes a Songbayanan that shows excellent teamwork since the season's premiere. Only the groups that have a perfect game of a round are only included in this section.

 Groups that had a perfect round of Sing in the Blank: 2 (50 Mangingisda, 50 Pahinante)
 Groups that had a perfect round of The ChooSing One: 4 (50 Beauticians, 50 Sales Agents, 50 Magsasaka, 50 Tricycle Drivers)
 Groups that had a perfect round of ReverSing: 1 (50 Sales Agents)
 Most number of a Songbayanans SONG-pu that had a perfect score: 2 (50 Sales Agents)

Time Collection & Usage
This section includes the most and least seconds banked by each group, and the fastest time for a group to win the jackpot prize.

 Most seconds banked by a group: 97 seconds (50 Traffic Enforcers)
 Least seconds banked by a group: 58 seconds (50 Tricycle Drivers)
 Fastest time for a group to win: 50 seconds (50 Bank Employees)

Everybody, GuesSing?
This section includes the final outcomes of every group, either good or bad, in the jackpot round.

 Highest answer streaks in a row in Everybody, GuesSing?: 7 (50 Bartenders)
 Lowest number of correct answers in Everybody, GuesSing?: 2 (50 Magsasaka)
 Groups that almost reached the perfect score in Everybody, GuesSing?: 2' (50 Mananahi, 50 Repair and Service Technicians)

ReceptionEverybody, Sing!'' drew high viewership on YouTube during its premiere and became a trending topic on Twitter nationwide. It recorded 111,966 concurrent views on its pilot episode (September 24) and rose to 139,668 concurrent views in its second episode on Sunday (September 25).

References

Notes

ABS-CBN original programming
Filipino-language television shows
Philippine game shows
2022 Philippine television seasons
2023 Philippine television seasons